This is the results breakdown of the local elections held in Castilla–La Mancha on 25 May 2003. The following tables show detailed results in the autonomous community's most populous municipalities, sorted alphabetically.

Overall

City control
The following table lists party control in the most populous municipalities, including provincial capitals (shown in bold). Gains for a party are displayed with the cell's background shaded in that party's colour.

Municipalities

Albacete
Population: 152,155

Ciudad Real
Population: 65,084

Cuenca
Population: 46,859

Guadalajara
Population: 69,098

Talavera de la Reina
Population: 77,519

Toledo
Population: 70,893

See also
2003 Castilian-Manchegan regional election

References

Castilla-La Mancha
2003